Rodolfo Guerra (born 17 April 1942) is a Mexican wrestler. He competed in the men's Greco-Roman 57 kg at the 1968 Summer Olympics.

References

1942 births
Living people
Mexican male sport wrestlers
Olympic wrestlers of Mexico
Wrestlers at the 1968 Summer Olympics